Fall Brawl was an annual professional wrestling pay-per-view (PPV) event produced by World Championship Wrestling (WCW) and was held in September from 1993 through 2000. The name was derived from the fall edition of Clash of the Champions, called "Fall Brawl", in 1988, 1989, 1990, and 1991. There was no Fall Brawl event held in 1992.

It was considered by many as WCW's answer to the World Wrestling Federation's annual Survivor Series pay-per-view event due to the main event WarGames match held during most of the Fall Brawl shows. World Wrestling Entertainment have owned the rights to Fall Brawl since they purchased WCW in March 2001 and although they have not produced the event under the main banner, Ohio Valley Wrestling did use the "Fall Brawl" name during the time it was a WWE development territory. In 2014, All WCW pay-per-views were made available on the WWE Network.

Events

References